Federal Highway 91D is a toll highway between Puente de Ixtla, Morelos and Iguala, Guerrero. The road is operated by Caminos y Puentes Federales. The toll is 70 pesos per car to travel Highway 91D.

References 

Mexican Federal Highways